is a Japanese actor, voice actor and narrator. He is affiliated with Haikyō.

Career
His stage name is Taketora.

After graduating from a prefectural high school, he entered Chiba University. He entered the Faculty of Engineering while working part-time.

After graduating from university, he joined a major game company and became a producer. After leaving the company, he joined Kyū Production, and after it dissolved, he moved to Haikyō.

Filmography

Television animation
2000s
Transformers: Cybertron (2005) – Soundwave, Mudflap
Street Fighter IV: The Ties That Bind (2009) – Akuma
2010s
Fullmetal Alchemist: Brotherhood (2010) – Hakuro, Hohenheim's Master
JoJo's Bizarre Adventure (2012) – Dire
Marvel Disk Wars: The Avengers (2014) – Baron Zemo
Gate: Jieitai Kano Chi nite, Kaku Tatakaeri (2015-2016) - Col. Naoki Kamo
Is It Wrong to Try to Pick Up Girls in a Dungeon? (2015) – Garneau Belway
Food Wars!: Shokugeki no Soma (2015–2018) – Osaji Kita
Marvel Future Avengers (2017) – Klaw
Hi Score Girl (2018) – Koharu's Father
Kemono Michi: Rise Up (2019) – Edgar

2020s
Suppose a Kid from the Last Dungeon Boonies Moved to a Starter Town (2021) – Chrome
The Way of the Househusband (2021) – Butcher

Unknown date

Bleach – Nakeem Greendina, Runuganga
Gabriel DropOut – Vigne's Father
Golgo 13 – Herman / Hebert
Guin Saga – Vion
Heaven's Memo Pad – Nemo
The Heroic Legend of Arslan – Bahman
High School DxD – Dohnaseek
Kaze no Stigma – Takeya Oogami
Ladies versus Butlers! – Selnia's Father
Mobile Suit Gundam: Iron-Blooded Orphans – Brooke Kabayan
Monster Hunter Stories: Ride On – Vim
Muv-Luv Alternative: Total Eclipse – Olson
One Piece – Gatz
Re:Creators – Magaki
Tokyo Ghoul – Taro
Yu-Gi-Oh! 5D's – Rutger Godwin

Theatrical animation
Tekken: Blood Vengeance (2011) – Panda

Video games
Street Fighter IV (2008) – Akuma
Super Street Fighter IV (2010) – Akuma
Marvel vs. Capcom 3: Fate of Two Worlds (2011) – Akuma
Ultimate Marvel vs. Capcom 3 (2011) – Akuma
Asura's Wrath (2012) – Akuma
Street Fighter X Tekken (2012) – Akuma
JoJo's Bizarre Adventure: All Star Battle (2013) – Dire
Final Fantasy XIV: A Realm Reborn (2013) (Patch) – Teledji Adeledji
 Final Fantasy XIV: Heavensward (2015) – Midgardsormr
 Fire Emblem Fates (2015) – Sumeragi, Rainbow Sage
Tekken 7: Fated Retribution (2016) – Akuma (uncredited)
Street Fighter V (2016) – Akuma
Ultra Street Fighter II: The Final Challengers (2017) – Akuma
Teppen (2020) – Akuma
The King of Fighters All Star (2022) – Akuma

Unknown date

Arslan: The Warriors of Legend – Bahman
Final Fantasy XII – Havharo
Liberation Maiden SIN – Oscar Goldman
Soulcalibur V – Main Bad Guy/Custom Male Voice

Dubbing roles

Animation
Ben 10 (Heatblast, Diamondhead, Ripjaws)
Phineas and Ferb (Norm)
Teen Titans (Red Star)
Ultimate Spider-Man (Absorbing Man)
Wreck-It Ralph (Ryu, Duncan)

References

External links
 Official blog 
 
 

1974 births
Living people
People from Amagasaki
Male voice actors from Hyōgo Prefecture
Japanese male video game actors
Japanese male voice actors
Chiba University alumni
21st-century Japanese male actors
Tokyo Actor's Consumer's Cooperative Society voice actors